Thomas Christian Tychsen (8 May 1758, Horsbüll – 23 October 1834, Göttingen) was a German orientalist and Lutheran theologian. He is known for his 1823 grammar of the Arabic language.

He studied theology and philology in Kiel and Göttingen, followed by an educational tour through Europe; France, Spain and Lombardy, completed with a lengthy stay in Vienna. In 1788, he became a full professor of theology at the University of Göttingen. He was a full member of the Göttingen Academy of Sciences and was associated with several foreign scientific societies.

He was the author of a book on Arabic grammar, Grammatik der arabischen Schriftsprache (1823), and edited works of the Greek poet Quintus Smyrnaeus. Among his better known students were Orientalists Wilhelm Gesenius (1786-1842) and Heinrich Ewald (1803-1875).

References 

2. Grammatik Der Arabischen Schriftsprache Für Den Ersten Unterricht: Mit Einigen Auszügen Aus Dem Koran , 1923

External links

 ADB: Tychsen, Thomas Christian @ Allgemeine Deutsche Biographie

1758 births
1834 deaths
German orientalists
German Lutheran theologians
18th-century German Protestant theologians
19th-century German Protestant theologians
Academic staff of the University of Göttingen
People from Nordfriesland
19th-century German male writers
German male non-fiction writers
18th-century German male writers